Robert Stewart, Duke of Albany (c. 1340 – 3 September 1420) was a member of the Scottish royal family who served as regent (at least partially) to three Scottish monarchs (Robert II, Robert III, and James I). A ruthless politician, Albany was widely regarded as having caused the murder of his nephew, the Duke of Rothesay, and brother to the future King James I of Scotland. James was held in captivity in England for eighteen years, during which time Albany served as regent in Scotland, king in all but name. He died in 1420 and was succeeded by his son, Murdoch Stewart, Duke of Albany, who was executed for treason when James returned to Scotland in 1425, almost causing the complete ruin of the Albany Stewarts.

Early life and ancestry
Robert Stewart was the third son of the future King Robert II of Scotland (1316–1390) and of Elizabeth Mure of Rowallan. His parents' marriage was deemed uncanonical at first, which, in some circles, gave their children and descendants the label of illegitimacy, but the granting of a papal dispensation in 1349 saw their remarriage and their children's legitimisation. Robert's grandfather was Walter Stewart, 6th High Steward of Scotland (1293–1326) and his father was the first monarch of the House of Stewart. His maternal great-grandfather was Robert the Bruce (1274–1329), legendary victor of the Battle of Bannockburn.

Robert Stewart was raised in a large family with many siblings. His older brother John Stewart (1337–1406) became Earl of Carrick in 1368 and would later be crowned King of Scotland under the name Robert III.

In 1361 Stewart married Margaret Graham, Countess of Menteith (1334–1380), a wealthy divorcee who took Robert as her fourth husband. His sister-in-law's claim to the Earldoms of Menteith and Fife allowed him to assume those titles, becoming Earl of Menteith and Earl of Fife. In 1362 the couple had a son and heir, Murdoch Stewart (1362–1425), who would in time inherit his father's titles and estates.

Stewart was responsible for the construction of Doune Castle, which remains largely intact today. When Stewart became Earl of Menteith, he was granted the lands on which Doune Castle now stands. Building may have started any time after this, and the castle was at least partially complete in 1381, when a charter was sealed here.

Politics and war

Scottish politics in the late fourteenth century was unstable and bloody, and much of Albany's career was spent acquiring territory, land and titles, often by violent means.

During the reign of their infirm father as King Robert II (1371–1390), Robert Stewart and his older brother Lord Carrick functioned as regents of Scotland, kings in all but name, with Albany serving as High Chamberlain of Scotland. He also led several military expeditions and raids into the Kingdom of England. Fife ensured at the December 1388 council meeting that the guardianship of Scotland would pass from Carrick (who had recently been badly injured from a horse-kick) to Fife. There was general approval of Fife's intention to properly resolve the situation of lawlessness in the north and in particular the activities of Alexander, Earl of Buchan, Lord of Badenoch and Ross, his younger brother. Buchan was stripped of his position of Justiciar North of the Forth, which would soon be given to Fife's son, Murdoch Stewart. Father and son would now work together to expand their family interest, bringing them into violent confrontation with other members of the nobility such as Donald McDonald, Lord of the Isles.

The Earl of Carrick acceded to the throne as King Robert III in 1390. His "sickness of the body" caused control of the kingdom to eventually devolve in 1399 to his son and heir apparent, David. In 1398 David had been created Duke of Rothesay and Robert had been created Duke of Albany, the first two dukedoms created in the Scottish Peerage. Power had begun to shift away from Albany and towards his nephew.

Murder of the Duke of Rothesay
However, the English soon invaded Scotland, and serious differences emerged between Albany and Rothesay. In 1401, Rothesay was accused of unjustifiably appropriating sums from the customs of the burghs on the east coast and confiscating the revenues of the temporalities of the vacant bishopric of St Andrews.  Rothesay had also in conjunction with his uncle, Alexander Stewart, Earl of Buchan, confronted Albany's influence in central Scotland—as soon his lieutenancy expired in 1402 Albany acted swiftly and ruthlessly. Rothesay was arrested and imprisoned in Albany's Falkland Castle where he died in March 1402.  Rothesay's death probably lay with Albany and Douglas who would have looked upon the possibility of the young prince acceding to the throne with great apprehension. Albany certainly fell under suspicion but he was cleared of all blame by a general council, which found that 'by divine providence and not otherwise, it is discerned that he [Duke Rothesay] departed from this life.' 

However, even though Albany was exonerated from blame, suspicions of foul play persisted, suspicions which never left Rothesay's younger brother the future James I of Scotland, and which would eventually lead to the downfall of the Albany Stewarts. John Debrett, writing in 1805, was in no doubt of Duke Robert's motives and guilt:
"This Robert, Duke of Albany, having obtained the entire government from his brother, King Robert, he caused the Duke of Rothesay to be murdered, thinking to bring the Crown into his own family".

After Rothesay's death, the King began to fear for his second son, James, who fled Scotland for his own safety. Debrett continues:
"to avoid the like fate, King Robert resolved to send his younger son James, to France, then about nine years old, who being sea-sick, and forced to land on the English coast...was detained a captive in England eighteen years. At these misfortunes King Robert died of grief in 1406."

Regent of Scotland

After the death of his brother, King Robert III, Albany ruled Scotland as regent. His young nephew, the future James I of Scotland, remained in exile and imprisonment in England for 18 years.  Albany made little effort to secure the young Prince's ransom and return to Scotland, focusing his energies instead on securing his own power and interest.

Albany's political triumph did not settle his differences with the other members of the nobility, in particular Donald Macdonald, Lord of the Isles, who in 1411 led an army of clansmen from the Isles and Northwest Highlands into open battle with the Stewarts. This conflict began when Albany had attempted to secure the Earldom of Ross for his second son, John, despite Macdonald's superior claim.  At the  Battle of Harlaw (known as "Red Harlaw" on account of its savagery) on 24 July 1411, losses were heavy on both sides, though Macdonald left with 9,000 men and the Earl of Mar and his lesser forces lay bleeding on the battlefield. The Lord of the Isles eventually prevailed in his claim to the Earldom of Ross.

The Stewart army was led by Albany's nephew, Alexander Stewart, Earl of Mar, who later sat on the jury of knights and peers which convicted Albany's son Murdoch Stewart, Duke of Albany and two of his sons of treason, virtually annihilating the Albany Stewarts.

Marriage and family

Albany married twice. Firstly, in 1361, he married Margaret Graham, Countess of Menteith (1334–1380), a wealthy divorcee who took him as her fourth husband. His sister-in-law's claim to the Earldoms of Menteith and Fife allowed him to assume those titles after marriage. The couple had eight children, seven daughters and a son:
Lady Janet Stewart (married Sir David de Moubray)
Lady Mary Stewart (married Sir William Abernathy, 6th of Saltoun)
 Lady Margaret Stewart (married to Sir John Swinton, 14th of that Ilk and had descendants)
Lady Joan Stewart (married Sir Robert Stewart, 1st Lord of Lorne and had descendants)
 Lady Beatrice Stewart (married Sir James Douglas of Balveny)
 Lady Isobel Stewart (married to Alexander Leslie, 7th Earl of Ross and later to Sir Walter de Haliburton, 1st Lord Haliburton of Dirleton and had descendants)
 Murdoch Stewart, Duke of Albany (1362–1425) (Married Joan Douglas and later to Isabel, Countess of Lennox).
 Lady Margery (married Sir Duncan Campbell, 1st Lord Campbell and had descendants)

Margaret died in 1380 and Albany subsequently married Muriella Keith, with whom he had three children:
John Stewart, 2nd Earl of Buchan (1381–1424); he fought in France against the English during the Hundred Years War, serving with distinction, but was killed at the Battle of Verneuil on 17 August 1424.
 Robert Stewart, Earl of Ross, died without issue
 Lady Elizabeth Stewart (married to Malcolm Fleming, ancestor of Malcolm Fleming, 3rd Lord Fleming)

Death and legacy

The Duke of Albany died in 1420 in Stirling Castle and lies buried in Dunfermline Abbey in Fife. He was succeeded as Duke of Albany and Regent of Scotland by his son, Murdoch Stewart, Duke of Albany. But Murdoch would not enjoy his power for long. In 1425, the exiled King James, captive in England for 18 years, finally returned to Scotland and executed Murdoch and most of his family for treason, causing the almost complete ruin of the Albany Stewarts.

Murdoch Stewart's sole surviving male heir was his youngest son, James the Fat, who fled to Ireland after a brief rebellion against the King over the arrest of his father and brothers. James remained in Ireland, unable to return, and died there in 1429. He was never able to inherit his father's titles, since they had been declared forfeit.

Albany's great-grandson, James "Beag" Stewart (c. 1410–1470), would eventually secure a pardon from the King and return to Scotland, though the family would never recover their lost estates. James "Beag" Stewart is the ancestor of the Stewarts of Ardvorlich on Lochearnside, whose family history is recounted by Sir Walter Scott in A Legend of Montrose.

Albany in fiction
Nigel Tranter's Stewart Trilogy covers the period when Albany was an important figure in Scotland.

See also
 Scottish monarchs family tree

References
 Debrett, John, p.233, The peerage of England, Scotland, and Ireland, London (1805) Retrieved November 2010
 
 * Mackie, J. D., A History of Scotland, Penguin Books, London (1964).
 McAndrew, Bruce A., Scotland's Historic Heraldry Retrieved November 2010
 Roberts, John L., p.16, Feuds, Forays and Febellions: History of the Highland Clans 1475-1625 Retrieved November 2010

Notes

References

External links
 
 
 Robert Stewart, 1st Duke of Albany

1340s births
1420 deaths
14th-century Scottish earls
15th-century Scottish peers
14th-century viceregal rulers
15th-century viceregal rulers
Burials at Dunfermline Abbey
Dukes of Albany
Earls of Atholl
2nd Earl of Buchan
Earls or mormaers of Fife
Heirs to the Scottish throne
House of Stuart
Regents of Scotland
Scottish princes
Sons of kings
Non-inheriting heirs presumptive